The Algeria national badminton team represents Algeria in international badminton team competitions. The team made their first-ever appearance at the Thomas Cup (World Men's Team Championships) in 2018. The Algerian team have never qualified for the Uber Cup and the Sudirman Cup.

The men's team later won the 2020 and 2022 All Africa Men's Team Badminton Championships. This earned the Algerian team a spot in the 2020 and 2022 Thomas Cup.

History 
Badminton was first played in Algeria in the 1990s in the city of Chlef. The sport then grew and began to spread around the cities of Aïn Defla, Relizane, Mostaganem and Boumerdès. The national team was formed around 1996 following the formation of the Algerian Badminton Association. In 1999, the national championships were organized to select the best players for the national setup.

Men's team 
The Algerian men's team first competed in the Pan Arab Games in 1999. The team then finished as runners-up in 2004 and then won gold in 2007 after beating Syria in the final. In 2010, the men's team made their African Men's Team Championship debut but lost in the group stages. In 2018, the Algerian men's team made history by winning the All Africa Men's Team Badminton Championship and qualifying for 2018 Thomas Cup. The team were placed in Group D and lost all their matches against Denmark, Malaysia and Russia.

The team qualified for the 2020 Thomas Cup after winning the 2020 All Africa Men's Team Championship final 3–2 against Mauritius. The team were eliminated in the group stages of the 2020 Thomas Cup. The team won the African Men's Team Championship for a third consecutive time in 2022 after defeating Egypt 3–0. At the 2022 Thomas Cup, the team failed to get past the group stage after finishing on the bottom of their group.

Women's team 
The Algerian women's team debuted in the 1999 Pan Arab Games. In 2018, the women's team debuted in the 2018 All Africa Women's Team Championship and reached the semifinals but lost to Mauritius. The team almost qualified for the 2020 Uber Cup when they finished 2nd at the 2020 All Africa Women's Team Championship. The team were halted in the group stage at the 2022 All Africa Women's Team Badminton Championship.

Mixed team 
The mixed team debuted in the 2003 African Games. They later made their debut at the African Mixed Team Championships in 2006 and finished as runners-up. The team then won bronze in the 2007 African Games. In 2015, the team were halted in the quarter-finals after losing to Seychelles 1–3. In 2019, they lost in the quarter-finals of the 2019 African Mixed Team Championships. After a few months, the team came back stronger and reached the final of the 2019 African Games. The team lost 0–3 to Nigeria in the final.

In 2021, the team lost their chances of qualifying for the Sudirman Cup at the mixed team championships to Egypt. In 2023, they failed to enter the final of the African Mixed Team Championships after losing narrowly to Mauritius.

Competitive record

Thomas Cup

African Team Championships

Men's team

Women's team

Mixed team

African Games

Mixed team

Pan Arab Games

Men's team

Women's team

Junior competitive record

Suhandinata Cup

Mixed team

African U19 Team Championships

Mixed team

African Youth Games

Men's team

Women's team

Mixed team

Staff 
The following list shows the coaching staff for the Algerian national badminton team.

Players

Current squad

Men's team

Women's team

References 

Badminton
National badminton teams
Badminton in Algeria